The Life and Religion of Mohammed is a book by author J. L. Menezes. It was written in 1912 in India and provides an account of Muhammad's life and the religion of Islam.

Biographies of Muhammad